Eremophila dalyana, commonly known as gidgee fuchsia bush, desert fuchsia or ilpengk by Alyawarre people in the Utopia homeland in  Central Australia, is a flowering plant in the figwort family, Scrophulariaceae and is endemic to an area of central Australia. It is a broom-like shrub or small tree with thin leaves and pale pink to white flowers. It is found in south-western Queensland, the extreme north east of South Australia and in a small area in the Northern Territory.

Description
It has many erect branches giving the plant a broom-like appearance. Most parts of the plant are covered with silvery or greyish scales.

The petal tube is a shade of pinkish lilac to white on the outside and has pale yellow spots inside. The outside surface is scaly and the inside of the petal lobes is hairy but the inside of the tube is filled with soft hairs. The 4 stamens are fully enclosed within the tube.

Taxonomy and naming
The species was first formally described by Ferdinand von Mueller in 1865 and the description was published in Fragmenta phytographiae Australiae. The specific epithet (dalyana) honours Sir Dominick Daly, Governor of South Australia from 1862 to 1868.

Distribution and habitat
Eremophila dalyana occurs in south-western Queensland and the extreme north east of South Australia. There is also a disjunct population in the south-eastern Northern Territory. It usually grows in sandy soil in mulga and gidgee communities.

Uses

Indigenous medicine
The Alyawarre people of the Utopia community regard this plant, which they call ilpengk to be a source of powerful medicines, which they use to treat respiratory complaints and skin complaints like scabies. The medicine is prepared by collecting leaves which are then ground into a paste, mixed with fat, boiled, strained and decanted.

Horticulture
Gidgee fuchsia bush is a very drought tolerant plant and flowers especially abundantly in the driest years. It is also long lived and some specimens have grown in gardens for more than 30 years. It is most easily grown from cuttings but in humid areas needs to be grafted onto Myoporum. It is hardy in a wide range of soils, grows in full or filtered sunlight and tolerates frost when mature.

References

External links
Video showing how indigenous Australians collect and process ilpengk to produce medicine: https://web.archive.org/web/20160304065051/http://central.batchelor.edu.au/film/ilpengk-slideshow/

dalyana
Plants described in 1865
Flora of Queensland
Flora of South Australia
Flora of the Northern Territory
Taxa named by Ferdinand von Mueller